Oinatz Aulestia Alkorta (born 23 March 1981) is a Spanish former footballer who played as a goalkeeper.

He appeared in 474 Segunda División B matches in a 20-year senior career, in service of a host of clubs. His professional input consisted of nine Segunda División games for Hércules.

Club career
Born in Ondarroa, Biscay, Basque Country, Aulestia finished his youth career with SD Eibar, and made his senior debut with their B team in the 2000–01 season. He played in Segunda División B but also in Tercera División the following years, representing UD Pájara Playas de Jandía, Bilbao Athletic, Cultural y Deportiva Leonesa, Real Oviedo and Cádiz CF.

On 30 July 2013, Aulestia signed with Segunda División club Hércules CF. On 11 September, aged 32, he appeared in his first professional match, a 2–0 home win over Real Murcia in the second round of the Copa del Rey. His first league appearance took place on 9 November in another victory for the hosts, now against UD Las Palmas (2–1).

Aulestia returned to the third tier after leaving the Estadio José Rico Pérez at the end of the campaign, retiring well past his 30s.

References

External links
 
 
 
 

1981 births
Living people
Spanish footballers
Footballers from the Basque Country (autonomous community)
Association football goalkeepers
Segunda División players
Segunda División B players
Tercera División players
SD Eibar footballers
Bilbao Athletic footballers
Cultural Leonesa footballers
Real Oviedo players
Cádiz CF players
Hércules CF players
CE L'Hospitalet players
CD Atlético Baleares footballers
CD El Ejido players
Arenas Club de Getxo footballers